Saul ben Judah Löb Shiskes (died 28 March 1797) was Polish rabbinical scholar. He was chiefly known as the author of Shevil ha-yashar, on Alfasi, only the first part of which was published (Vilna, 1839). Shiskes acknowledges in the preface that he was assisted in his work by Solomon, the younger brother of Ḥayyim of Volozhin, who annotated it and contributed to some extent to it.

References
 

1797 deaths
18th-century Lithuanian rabbis
18th-century Polish rabbis
Rabbis from Vilnius